USS Okinawa (LPH–3) was the second Iwo Jima-class amphibious assault ship of the United States Navy. She was the second Navy ship assigned the name "Okinawa", in honor of the World War II Battle of Okinawa.

Construction 
Okinawa was laid down on 1 April 1960 (15th anniversary of the invasion of Okinawa) by the Philadelphia Naval Shipyard, Philadelphia, Pennsylvania; launched on 19 August 1961; sponsored by Mrs. John L. McClellan, wife of Arkansas Senator John L. McClellan; and commissioned on 14 April 1962.

History

Early career
Following commissioning and sea trials, Okinawa departed Philadelphia on 20 June 1962 for her homeport, Norfolk, Va., where she spent a month fitting out. After a six-week shakedown cruise out of Guantanamo Bay, Cuba and another month in Norfolk, the amphibious assault ship began participation in her first fleet exercise in the Caribbean, 15 October. Shortly thereafter the Cuban Missile Crisis arose and Okinawa remained in the area, lending force to the United States' stand, until 3 December, when she returned to Norfolk.

The first half of 1963 was spent in availability at the Philadelphia and Norfolk Naval Shipyards and further trial operations in the Caribbean and out of Norfolk. On 9 July, Okinawa began her first formal Caribbean deployment, returning to Norfolk on 1 October and spending the remainder of that year and the first part of the next in that area. During June 1964, she sailed to Newport, Rhode Island and New York City for the World's Fair. On 7 October, she left on her first trip to European waters, for operation "Steel Pike I," an amphibious exercise off the coast of Spain. After a stop in France and a goodwill visit to Plymouth, England, Okinawa arrived back in Norfolk at the end of November.

Dominican Republic
In April 1965, while participating in an exercise off Puerto Rico, Okinawa was alerted and sent to an area off the Dominican Republic to act as medical evacuation ship with HMM-263 (Reinf) and the 1st Bn., 2d Marines during the Dominican crisis. The mission concluded on 29 May. Then, following the end of her deployment, she proceeded via Norfolk to Philadelphia for overhaul. In April 1966 she returned to Norfolk and began her third Caribbean deployment on 13 June. Okinawa was transferred to the Pacific Fleet; she set sail  for the West Coast on 24 January 1967 and arrived at San Diego, her new home port, on 8 February.

Vietnam and Apollo spacecraft recovery
Okinawa left on 10 March for her first deployment off Vietnam. On 13 April, while sailing from Okinawa to Taiwan, the ship was diverted by a distress call, and the next day rescued all 38 persons from the grounded Panamanian vessel Silver Peak near the Sento Shosho Islands. While off Vietnam, Okinawa was a mobile base from which a well-equipped force of marines could quickly strike via helicopters at the Communist insurgents. She returned to San Diego on 5 December.

On 4 April 1968, after an intensive period of special training, Okinawa recovered the unmanned Apollo 6 space capsule 380 miles north of Kauai, Hawaii. With further exercises and upkeep, she conducted her second Westpac deployment from 2 November to 26 June 1969, when she arrived in San Diego for leave and upkeep.

On 17 May 1970, Okinawa delivered ten A-4K Skyhawk single-seaters, and four TA-4K two-seaters to New Zealand, after their purchase for the Royal New Zealand Air Force. The ship survived a severe storm after leaving Hawaii and the captain considered dumping the aircraft into the sea to save his ship but the storm abated.

In 1970 Okinawa was awarded the Philippine Presidential Unit Citation for her humanitarian assistance to the people of Lagonoy Gulf, Republic of the Philippines, who had been devastated by Typhoon Jean in October 1970.

On 7 August 1971, Okinawa was the recovery ship for the Apollo 15 spacecraft and crew of the fourth crewed Apollo program lunar landing mission.

The Downfall of Republic of Cambodia 
In April 1975, Okinawa participated in Operation Eagle Pull, the evacuation of Phnom Penh, Cambodia and Operation Frequent Wind, the evacuation of Saigon, Vietnam.

From 7 October 1987 to 7 April 1988, Okinawa was deployed to the Persian Gulf in support of mine sweeping operations and MAGTF 1-88. She began her deployment heading West and continued West, circumnavigating the world.

Gulf War
Okinawa was the command ship of the 13th Marine Expeditionary Unit in August 1990 as part of a WestPac deployment when it was diverted to the Persian Gulf in support of Operations Desert Shield and Desert Storm. Helicopters were launched as a diversion during the start of the ground phase of the war.

Fate
Okinawa was decommissioned and stricken from the Naval Vessel Register on 17 December 1992. She was transferred to MARAD and laid up in the National Defense Reserve Fleet, in Suisun Bay, Benicia, Calif.

After being hit by several Maverick, Harpoon missiles, and general-purpose bombs, the ex-Okinawa was finally sunk by a Mk 48 torpedo fired by the USS Portsmouth.

Awards, citations, and campaign ribbons 

 Top Row: Combat Action Ribbon (2) / Navy Unit Commendation (5)
 Second Row: Navy Meritorious Unit Commendation (3) / Navy Battle "E" Ribbon / Navy Expeditionary Medal (1: Cuba, 2: Iran/Indian Ocean)
 Third Row: National Defense Service Medal / Armed Forces Expeditionary Medal (1: Cuba, 1: Dominican Republic, 1: Op. Eagle Pull, 1:Op. Frequent Wind, 2: Persian Gulf Op. Earnest Will) / Vietnam Service Medal (7)
 Fourth Row: Southwest Asia Service Medal / Humanitarian Service Medal (1: Eagle Pull, 1: Frequent Wind) / Philippine Presidential Unit Citation
 Fifth Row: Republic of Vietnam Gallantry Cross Unit Citation (5) / Republic of Vietnam Campaign Medal / Kuwait Liberation Medal (Kuwait)

Gallery

References

External links 

 history.navy.mil: USS Okinawa

 

1960 ships
Cold War amphibious warfare vessels of the United States
Gulf War ships of the United States
Iwo Jima-class amphibious assault ships
Ships built in Philadelphia
Ships sunk as targets
Space capsule recovery ships
Vietnam War amphibious warfare vessels of the United States